Margaret Quainoo (1941-2006), also known as Araba Stamp, was a Ghanaian actress and entertainer. She featured in the classic film I Told You So of 1970 and in the Efiewura television series. She plated at numerous concert parties and in many movie performances in Ghana. She dropped out of school and joined the Brigade Drama Group at Nungua, a suburb in Accra.

Selected filmography
Key Soap Concert Party
 I Told You So (1970)
 Efiewura
Sika Sunsum (1991)
The Lost Stool

Death 
She died at the 37 Military Hospital in Accra after a short illness.

References 

2006 deaths
Ghanaian television actresses
Ghanaian film actresses
1941 births